Guérin is a township municipality in northwestern Quebec, Canada, in the Témiscamingue Regional County Municipality.  It was named for James John Edmund Guerin.

Demographics 

Population trend:
 Population in 2006: 295 (2001 to 2006 population change: -1.7%)
 Population in 2001: 300
 Population in 1996: 297
 Population in 1991: 274

Private dwellings occupied by usual residents: 118 (total dwellings: 193)

Mother tongue:
 English as first language: 0%
 French as first language: 95.4%
 English and French as first language: 4.6%
 Other as first language: 0%

See also
 List of township municipalities in Quebec

References

Township municipalities in Quebec
Incorporated places in Abitibi-Témiscamingue
Témiscamingue Regional County Municipality